is an island in Ago Bay. It is in the city of Shima, Mie Prefecture, Japan.

The island was uninhabited until the 1920s when a railway built by Shima Electric Railway (now known as the Shima Line) was constructed to serve as the endpoint of the line. This railway sparked the creation of a tourism industry that still thrives. Kintetsu runs limited express trains from Osaka and Nagoya directly to this island and has many business enterprises there.

Kashiko Island hosted the 42nd G7 summit in May 2016.

Gallery 

Islands of Mie Prefecture